Laing's Nek, or Lang's Nek is a pass through the Drakensberg mountain range in South Africa, immediately north of Majuba, at  at an elevation of 5400 to . It is the lowest part of a ridge that slopes from Majuba to the Buffalo River. Before the opening of the railway in 1891, the road over the nek was the main artery of communication between Durban and Pretoria. The railway crosses the pass via a  tunnel.

History
There are two possible explanations for its name. It could be named after Henry Laing, owner of a farm at its foot, or after William Timothy Lang, who bought a farm in 1874 at its base.

When the Boers rose in revolt in December 1880, they occupied Laing's Nek to oppose the entry of British reinforcements into the Transvaal. On 28 January 1881, a small British force endeavoured to drive the Boers from the pass but was forced to retire after the Battle of Laing's Nek.

References

Mountain passes of KwaZulu-Natal